Aaron Fiacconi (born November 12, 1979, in Sault Ste. Marie, Ontario) is a retired professional Canadian football offensive lineman. He announced his retirement on June 2, 2012. He most recently played for five seasons for the Edmonton Eskimos of the Canadian Football League. He was signed as fourth round draft pick (32nd overall) by the Montreal Alouettes in the 2002 CFL Draft. He played college football at Mansfield.

Fiacconi has also played for the Winnipeg Blue Bombers. Currently, he stays involved in football by coaching offensive linemen at a high school in the Edmonton Area.
Fiacconi was inducted into the Sault Ste Marie Sports Hall of Fame in 2015.

References 

1979 births
Living people
Canadian football offensive linemen
Edmonton Elks players
Montreal Alouettes players
Sportspeople from Sault Ste. Marie, Ontario
Players of Canadian football from Ontario
Winnipeg Blue Bombers players